An unbeliever or infidel is one accused of unbelief in the central tenets of a religion.

Unbeliever or unbelievers may also refer to:

Film
The Unbeliever, 1918 American silent propaganda film made towards the end of World War I
The Unbelievers, a 2013 documentary film about atheists Richard Dawkins and Lawrence Krauss

Music
"Unbeliever", a song by Skrewdriver from All Skrewed Up 1977
"Unbeliever", a song by Australian rock band Hunters & Collectors "Throw Your Arms Around Me" 1984
"Unbeliever", a song by Greek death metal band Septic Flesh Sumerian Daemons 2003
"Unbeliever", a song by Therapy on Troublegum 1994 and Infernal Love 1995
"The Unbeliever", a song by German power metal band Edguy Theater of Salvation 1999
"Unbelievers" (song), from the 2013 album Modern Vampires of the City
"Unbelievers", a song by Starflyer 59 from the album Old 2003

See also

 
Believer (disambiguation)
Heathen (disambiguation)
Heretic (disambiguation)
Apostasy
Atheism, absence of belief in deities
Heresy
Sacrilege